The American Golden Topaz, a 172-faceted topaz weighing , is the largest cut yellow topaz in the world, and one of the largest faceted gems of any type in the world.  Originating from Minas Gerais, Brazil, it was cut by Leon Agee over a period of two years from an 11.8 kg (26 lb avdp) stream-rounded cobble owned by Drs. Marie L. and Edgar F. Borgatta.  It was contributed jointly by the Borgatta owners and by Rockhound Hobbyists of America to the Smithsonian Institution in 1988 and is displayed in the National Museum of Natural History in Washington, D.C.

See also
 List of individual gemstones

External links 
American Golden Topaz

Individual topazes
Jewellery in the collection of the Smithsonian Institution